Valencia CF had a successful season, finishing in the top four of La Liga and thus qualifying for the UEFA Champions League for the first time in almost 30 years, thanks to the extension of the competition to include more teams from the top leagues. Valencia also won the Copa del Rey, ending a long trophy drought and marking a successful end to Italian coach Claudio Ranieri's first spell at the club. Among the main players behind the success included Gaizka Mendieta, Javier Farinós and lethal striker Claudio López.

At the end of the season, Ranieri left to manage Atlético Madrid; he was replaced by Argentine Héctor Cúper, who had led Mallorca to third place and the Cup Winners' Cup final.

Squad
Squad at end of season

Transfers

Left club during season

Competitions

La Liga

League table

Results by round

Matches

Top scorers
  Claudio López 21
  Adrian Ilie 11
  Angulo 8
  Gaizka Mendieta 7
  Stefan Schwarz 4

Copa del Rey

Eightfinals

Quarterfinals

Semifinals

Final

UEFA Intertoto Cup

Quarterfinals

Semifinals

Finals

UEFA Cup

First round

Second round

Statistics

Players statistics

References 

Valencia CF seasons
Valencia